Vasco Martins de Alvelos (also as Vasco Martins of Alvelos) (d. 23 October 1313) was a Portuguese prelate.

Biography
Vasco Martins was probably born in Alvelos.  He was the son of Martin Anes de Alvelos, Honorable Lord  of Alvelos and Elvira Mendes da Fonseca.

He became dean of the See of Lamego.  In 1296/97, he became the 12th bishop of Lamego and succeeded Bishop John III.  On 14 February 1302, he became the 7th bishop of Guarda, and no longer remained bishop of Lamego, he was transferred and was succeeded by Alphonse of Asturia, as bishop of Guarda, he succeeded João Martins.

On December 27, 1302, at the Caria in nearby Belmonte, he put along with his brother Estevão Martins, Knight of Alvelos and was also the first Lord of Alvelos, with his chair at Santa Maria de Tesouro in the See of Lamego, and head of the Honour of Alvelos in the See of Lamego, in which linked Quintã da Torre de Figueiredo de Alva and the settlement of Ladreda, both in São Pedro do Sul and otherwise, all the properties of the father, the knight Martim Anes of Alvelos, but leaves, its institution to his mother Elvira Mendes da Fonseca to possess Quintã da Torre de Figueiredo de Alva.

In his testament which was made in Caria, Belmonte, at the end of Covilhã, dated from 23 October 1311, two years later, he died in Guarda as he was then bishop, he was succeeded by Bishop Roderick III.

The Lords of Morgado de Alvelos which was founded in support of his brother, it was known as the Lords of the Honour of Alvelos, in between it once had Paço de Figueiredo das Donas, the first in Portugal located in the South (Sul, now São Pedro do Sul), survived into Morgado de Alvelos, brought its successive women for some centuries which always kept the last name and the crests of Alvelus in use for that house, it was extinct in the early 20th century.  It currently genealogically represents that medieval house with its descendants of  Francisco de Assis de Melo Lemos e Alvelos, 1st Viscount of Serrato and 19th Lord of Morgado de Alvelos, it belonged to the chair of the See of Lamego with its bishop D. Vasco Martins de Alvelos.

References

Sources
 Manuel Abranches de Soveral, Ascendências Visienses. Ensaio genealógico sobre a nobreza de Viseu. Séculos XIV a XVII (Visonian Descendants: Genealogic Essay on the Nobles of Viseu, 14th and 15th Centuries), Porto 2004, .

External links
Vasco Martins de Alvelos at Catholic Hierarchy 

Year of birth unknown
1313 deaths
14th-century Roman Catholic bishops in Portugal
People from Barcelos, Portugal
Bishops of Lamego
Bishops of Guarda